Erphaea is a genus of beetles in the family Cerambycidae, containing the following species:

 Erphaea pumicosa Erichson, 1847
 Erphaea stigma Martins & Monné, 1974

References

Acanthocinini